Sven "Svängis" Folke Lennart Johansson (8 July 1914 – 12 October 1982) was a Swedish cyclist. He competed in the individual and team road race events at the 1936 Summer Olympics.

References

External links
 

1914 births
1982 deaths
Swedish male cyclists
Olympic cyclists of Sweden
Cyclists at the 1936 Summer Olympics
Sportspeople from Stockholm
Hammarby IF-related people